Anbu Sagodharargal is a 1973 Indian Tamil-language film directed by Lakshmi Deepak. It is a remake of the director's own Telugu film Pandanti Kapuram. The film stars Jaishankar, S. V. Ranga Rao, Jamuna, Major Sundarrajan, Devika, A. V. M. Rajan, Prameela and Vennira Aadai Nirmala. It was released on 4 May 1973.

Plot

Cast 
 S. V. Ranga Rao as Dharmaraj
 Major Sundarrajan as Selvaraj
 A. V. M. Rajan as Durairaj
 Jaishankar as Prem
 Jamuna as Rani Malini Devi/Kamala
 Devika
 Prameela
 Vennira Aadai Nirmala
 Cho as Gopi
 V. K. Ramasamy
 Manorama
 Srikanth as Prakash
 Roja Ramani
 V. S. Raghavan

Soundtrack 
The music was composed by K. V. Mahadevan.

References

External links 
 

1970s Tamil-language films
1973 drama films
1973 films
Films directed by Lakshmi Deepak
Films scored by K. V. Mahadevan
Indian drama films
Tamil remakes of Telugu films